The Laquette is a river of northern France, right tributary of the Lys. It flows into the Lys in Aire-sur-la-Lys.

References

Rivers of France
Rivers of the Pas-de-Calais
Rivers of Hauts-de-France